Mommy's Bliss is a family-run company, started by Roshan Kaderali.  After raising three kids, working as a registered nurse, lactation consultant, doula and midwife she founded the company in 1999. Roshan recommended gripe water for infants with colic and fussiness. However, gripe water was not available in America.

History 

Mommy's Bliss is a mother-daughter run company that focuses on providing baby products. The company was founded in 1999, by Registered Nurse, Certified Midwife, Roshan Kaderali. The Kaderali family started the business with $10,000 from their savings. Roshan Kaderali was a nurse in Scotland and  believed that she saw benefits of gripe water for children who suffer from colic and other stomach maladies. The UK National Health Service, however, no longer recommends the use of gripe water as there is no scientific evidence to support its use. She looked for a similar product in the U.S. to help meet the demand for a remedy for colic.  Since, there was nothing on the market, Kaderali began selling gripe water.

In 2008, the U.S. FDA and Health Canada warned that Mother's Bliss Nipple Cream may cause respiratory distress and other complications in infants. The product was subsequently discontinued.

As of 2013, their gripe water is one of the best-selling colic relief products. Gripe water, which is traditionally though to ease stomach problems in children, but has no basis in science, sold one million bottles each year.

Mommy's Bliss was listed on the Inc 5,000 and recognized as one of the fastest growing private companies of 2013.

External links

References 

American companies established in 1999
Companies based in San Rafael, California